Change of Heart is a 1938 American comedy film directed by James Tinling and written by Frances Hyland and Albert Ray. The film stars Gloria Stuart, Michael Whalen, Lyle Talbot, Delmar Watson and Jane Darwell. The film was released on January 14, 1938, by 20th Century Fox.

Plot

Cast    
Gloria Stuart as Carol Murdock
Michael Whalen as Anthony Murdock
Lyle Talbot as Phillip Reeves
Delmar Watson as Jimmy Milligan
Jane Darwell as Mrs. Thompson

References

External links 
 
 

1938 films
20th Century Fox films
American comedy films
1938 comedy films
Films directed by James Tinling
American black-and-white films
Golf films
Films scored by Samuel Kaylin
1930s English-language films
1930s American films